Gordon Lindsay Weir (2 June 1908 – 31 October 2003) was a New Zealand cricketer who played 11 Test matches for New Zealand from 1930 to 1937. He lost his hair early, and looked older than his teammates, so became known as Dad Weir. He was the world's oldest Test cricketer upon his death.

Domestic career
Weir was born in Auckland. He was a right-hand batsman and a right-arm medium-paced bowler. He also made nine first-class appearances for the Auckland rugby union team, playing mainly at fly-half.

He played first-class cricket for Auckland from 1927–28 to 1946–47, scoring 10 centuries and taking 107 wickets.  An accomplished stroke-player, he achieved his highest first-class score, 191, against Otago in December 1935.

International career
He was not selected for New Zealand's first Test match, against the touring MCC side in 1930, but played in the three other Tests of the series. He also played in all three Tests in New Zealand's tour to England in 1931, scoring 1,035 runs on the tour at a batting average of 25.87, including 96 runs at 24.00 in the Tests. Back home, he played two Tests against South Africa in 1932, and two against England in 1933.  He was dropped for the 1935–36 series against the MCC, but recalled for a last Test at the Oval in 1937. He scored three Test half-centuries, and took seven Test wickets.

Late career
After the Second World War II, he was the selector-coach of the Auckland teenage Brabin Cup team for 12 years.  He taught English at Mount Albert Grammar School in Auckland, where he also coached rugby and cricket.

Weir became the oldest living Test cricketer in 2001, after the death of English cricketer Alf Gover, against whom Weir had played in the Test at the Oval in 1937.  He died in Auckland in 2003, and was succeeded as the world's oldest Test cricketer by Indian cricketer M. J. Gopalan.

See also
 List of Auckland representative cricketers

References
 'Dad' Weir, world's oldest Test cricketer, dies in Auckland, ESPNcricinfo, 31 October 2003
 'Dad' Weir becomes Test cricket's oldest survivor, ESPNcricinfo, 10 October 2001
 Obituary: Gordon Lindsay Weir, New Zealand Herald, 8 November 2003

External links
 

1908 births
2003 deaths
Auckland cricketers
New Zealand Test cricketers
New Zealand cricketers
New Zealand Army cricketers